Lest We Forget: The Best Of is the first greatest hits album by American rock band Marilyn Manson. It was released on September 28, 2004, by Interscope Records. The album was conceived by the band's eponymous vocalist as a "farewell compilation", and was originally going to feature a duet with Shirley Manson of Garbage. Upon its completion, neither singer was satisfied with the duet, and it remains unreleased. Instead, the band recorded a cover of Depeche Mode's "Personal Jesus" (1989), which became the only new track on the album and was released as a single. The deluxe version of the album included a bonus DVD containing sixteen music videos, one of which was the previously unreleased uncensored version of the music video for "Saint" (2004).

Lest We Forget: The Best Of received mostly positive reviews from music critics, several of whom complimented its track listing. The compilation's commercial performance exceeded expectations in the United States, where it sold over 78,000 copies in its first week of release and had sold over a million copies as of late 2010. It was also successful internationally, peaking within the top 10 of national record charts in Austria, Germany, Spain, Sweden, Switzerland and the United Kingdom. The band promoted the album with their "Against All Gods Tour".

Background and release

The band's eponymous vocalist conceived Lest We Forget: The Best Of as a "farewell compilation", but not a greatest hits album, as "I was never really a top-40 artist." Nevertheless, multiple critics classified the record as a greatest hits album. Prior to the album's release, Manson said that he was going to abandon music in favor of becoming a visual artist and pursuing other non-musical careers; this did not happen. Explaining his frame of mind when he made the album, Manson said, "You get frustrated sometimes when you know that your heart is really buried in your art, and you know more success equals being more mediocre. So you have to redefine success, and you can't compete with people who don't do what you do."

Initially, the album was going to include a duet between the band's frontman and Garbage vocalist Shirley Manson. The track – a cover of The Human League's "Don't You Want Me" (1981) – was recorded after the two artists met at a Yeah Yeah Yeahs concert and enjoyed each other's company. After the cover's completion, Marilyn admitted that he "wasn't in the best frame of mind when I did it". Shirley commented on the cover: "It's really cool but neither of us felt comfortable putting it on our records so I don't know if it will ever come out. I hope it does. Our voices sound fantastic in a very Beauty and the Beast kind of way." Both singers wanted to try to collaborate again sometime in the future, and Manson said that he enjoyed working with Shirley.

After making the decision not to include the duet on Lest We Forget, Marilyn Manson took a break from making music. After receiving fellatio with a rosary wrapped around his penis, Manson had the idea to cover Depeche Mode's "Personal Jesus" (1989) for the album. Manson said that he wanted to cover "Personal Jesus" because he found Depeche Mode's music hypnotic, sexy and inspirational. Manson told MTV that "I thought if I had to write a song, [the lyrics of 'Personal Jesus' are] exactly what I would say. And that's why I picked this song, because I think it takes a little more of an ironic tone when you put it in context with what's going on today." The band's version of "Personal Jesus" is the only new song on the album, and was released as a single.

The cover of Lest We Forget is a watercolor self-portrait by Manson entitled Experience Is the Mistress of Fools. Copies of Lest We Forget contain a booklet with 29 pictures of the band's frontman, while a limited edition version of the record includes a bonus DVD containing 16 of the band's music videos. The deluxe version also includes the uncensored version of the "Saint" music video, which had not previously been released. MTV reported that the band would embark on the Against All Gods Tour in support of the compilation.

Critical reception

In Spin, Chuck Klosterman called the compilation "[f]ucking awesome" and said "there are only about ten compelling metal acts out there right now, and Marilyn Manson is three of them." BBC Music's Richard Banks praised the album's "superb production" and Manson's "genius one-liners", saying "when the knob labelled 'shock-tactics' is already set to 10, one can't help but wonder where [Manson will] go from here." The Chicago Maroon Matt Zakosek opined "It would be easy to write a pithy, sarcastic review deriding Manson for his over-the-top showmanship-but sometime in the midst of all that devilish preening and posturing, he found the time to make some pretty good music."

Richard Abowitz of Rolling Stone stated that Lest We Forget "includes all of [Manson's] essential pied-piper calls to alienated suburban youth" and that "Manson's mix of fetish, goth, hedonism and metal still jells". A reviewer for Blabbermouth.net said that the album's track listing features "all of the group's classics". Monica S. Kuebler of Exclaim! said "if you've been holding onto your hard-earned bones waiting for that one essential Marilyn Manson collection (without the filler), you may want to proceed directly to the nearest record store and turn those bones over immediately."

Stephen Thomas Erlewine of AllMusic found the album's omission of "Dope Hat" (1994), "Man That You Fear" (1996) and "I Don't Like the Drugs (But the Drugs Like Me)" (1998) "curious". He added that "Nevertheless, [Lest We Forget] has enough of the hits to make this worthwhile for the casual fans, as well as those listeners who never wanted to admit that [the band's] late-'90s alt-rock radio staples were guilty pleasures." In his book Dissecting Marilyn Manson, Gavin Baddeley opined that "for an album artist like Manson, [greatest hits] collections do fly in the face of the careful structure behind his best work, where the running order is an intrinsic feature of the package." Baddeley felt that, like the band's EP Smells Like Children (1995), "Lest We Forget is redeemed by a clever cover of an eighties pop song, in this case Depeche Mode's 'Personal Jesus'". Writing for PopMatters, Lance Teegarden described the band's cover of "Sweet Dreams (Are Made of This)" (1995), "The Beautiful People" (1996) and "Mobscene" (2003) as "[a] few choice hits on a far too lengthy and same-sounding best-of."

Commercial performance
Industry forecasters predicted the album was on course to debut on the Billboard 200 with first week sales of around 60,000 units. It went on to debut at number nine on the chart, selling 78,715 copies on its first week. It would spend a total of 27 weeks on the chart, and was certified gold by the Recording Industry Association of America in October 2005 for shipments in excess of 500,000 units. As of November 2010, Lest We Forget had sold over a million copies in the United States. It also debuted at number three on the Canadian Albums Chart.

The album was successful internationally as well, particularly in Europe, where it debuted at number five on Billboards European Top 100 Albums after peaking within the top 10 of national record charts in Austria, Germany, Spain, Sweden, Switzerland and the United Kingdom. It also peaked at number two on the Compilation Albums Chart in France, and was certified gold by the Syndicat National de l'Édition Phonographique (SNEP) for shipments in excess of 100,000 units there. In 2017, IFPI Denmark awarded the record a platinum certification for shipments of over 20,000 units. The set originally peaked at number 20 on Denmark's Hitlisten. Similarly, Lest We Forget received a platinum award from the British Phonographic Industry (BPI) in 2017 for shipments in excess of 300,000 copies there. The album peaked at number four on the UK Albums Chart upon release, and peaked also at the same position on the German Albums Chart, where it was certified gold by the Bundesverband Musikindustrie (BVMI) for shipments of over 100,000 units.

The album peaked at number 15 in both Australia and Japan, and debuted at number nine in New Zealand. It was certified gold by the Australian Recording Industry Association (ARIA) for shipments of over 35,000 copies in that country. It also peaked within the top 20 of the national charts in Belgium, Greece, Italy, Norway, Portugal, and Scotland.

Track listing

Notes
  signifies a co-producer
  signifies an additional producer
 "Mobscene" is stylized as "mOBSCENE".
 "Saint" is stylized as "(s)AINT".
 The bonus DVD contains the following easter eggs: the Autopsy short film, the making of the "Mobscene" video, and the performance version of the "Disposable Teens" video.

Personnel
Credits adapted from the liner notes of the international edition of Lest We Forget: The Best Of.

Marilyn Manson
 Marilyn Manson – vocals
 Tim Sköld – guitars, bass
 Madonna Wayne Gacy – keyboards
 Ginger Fish – drums

Additional musicians
 Kelli Ali – additional vocals

Technical

 Dave Sardy – production, mixing 
 Marilyn Manson – production ; co-production 
 Tim Sköld – production 
 Mark "Spike" Stent – mixing 
 Ben Grosse – co-production ; mixing ; additional production 
 Michael Beinhorn – production 
 Sean Beavan – additional production ; mixing ; engineering 
 Tom Lord-Alge – mixing 
 Trent Reznor – production ; mixing 
 Alan Moulder – mixing 
 Mark Freegard – mixing 
 Dave "Rave" Ogilvie – production

Artwork

 Marilyn Manson – all art, photography, video stills
 Joseph Cultice – photography
 Ross Halfin – photography
 Gottfried Helnwein – photography
 Dean Karr – photography
 Perou – photography
 P. R. Brown – photography
 Floria Sigismondi – photography
 Chad Michael Ward – photography, layout
 Greg Watermann – photography
 Pierre et Gilles – officer portrait
 Liam Ward – production
 Nathan Cox – video stills
 Lukas Ettlin – video stills

Charts

Weekly charts

Year-end charts

Certifications

References

2004 greatest hits albums
2004 video albums
Albums produced by Marilyn Manson
Albums produced by Michael Beinhorn
Albums produced by Trent Reznor
Interscope Records compilation albums
Marilyn Manson (band) albums
Marilyn Manson (band) video albums